Metonitazene is an analgesic compound related to etonitazene, which was first reported in 1957, and has been shown to have approximately 100 times the potency of morphine by central routes of administration, but if used orally it has been shown to have approximately 10 times the potency of morphine.

Its effects are similar to other opioids such as fentanyl and heroin, including analgesia, euphoria, and sleepiness. Adverse effects include vomiting, and respiratory depression that can potentially be fatal. Because of high dependency potential and dangerous adverse effects it has never been introduced into pharmacotherapy.

Legal status
In the United States, metonitazene is a Schedule I controlled substance under the Controlled Substances Act.

Metonitazene is not controlled under the 1971 Convention on Psychotropic Substances; however, in many countries possession or intent to sell for human consumption might be prosecuted under several analog acts.

See also 
 AH-7921
 Etonitazepyne
 Isotonitazene
 MT-45
 Piperidylthiambutene
 U-47700

References 

Analgesics
Abandoned drugs
Designer drugs
Benzimidazole opioids
Diethylamino compounds